Lâm Cung Thánh Mẫu or Mẫu Thượng Ngàn or Bà Chúa Thượng Ngàn (Princess of the Forest) is ruler of the Forest Palace among the spirits of the Four Palaces in Vietnamese indigenous religion. In legend the Princess of the Forest was the daughter of prince Tản Viên Sơn Thánh (Sơn Tinh) and Mỵ Nương, công chúa Quế Mỵ Nương King Hung's daughter from the legend of the rivalry between Sơn Tinh and the sea god Thủy Tinh. Many natural features around Vietnam feature shrines to her, such as the Suối Mỡ thermal springs area near the town of Bắc Giang.

References

Vietnamese mythology
Vietnamese folk religion
Vietnamese goddesses
Vietnamese gods
Vietnamese deities
Mountain goddesses